Elections in Italy are held at least at four levels: European Parliament, Italian Parliament (composed of the Chamber of Deputies and the Senate of the Republic), Regional Councils and municipal councils. Several political parties compete and have different results, depending on elections.

The electoral results of the current main political parties, since their establishment, are displayed in this article.

Brothers of Italy

Italian Parliament

European Parliament

Regional Councils

Democratic Party

Italian Parliament

European Parliament

Regional Councils

Forza Italia

Italian Parliament

European Parliament

Regional Councils

Five Star Movement

Italian Parliament

European Parliament

Regional Councils

Lega Nord

Italian Parliament

European Parliament

Regional Councils

Centre-North 
Results in the ten central-northern regions and in the two autonomous provinces, where the party has national sections. Results before 1991 refer to their forerunners.

Centre-South 
Results in the remaining eight central-southern regions, where the party is active through Lega per Salvini Premier. Results before 2008 refer to previous sister parties.

Political history of Italy
Electoral history